Kõrvemaa (or  ('Middle Estonian Lowland')) is a geographical region in Northern Estonia. Its area is 3130 km2, with length of 110 and width of 40 km.

The region is characterised by wetlands (37.7% of the region) and forests. Settlement is scarce.

High percent of the region is under protection: there are Põhja-Kõrvemaa and Kõrvemaa Landscape Conservation Area, also part of Lahemaa National Park.

References

External links
About Kõrvemaa, Estonian e-Encyclopedia

Geography of Estonia
Regions of Estonia